Gareth Moore (born 3 June 1989) is a former professional rugby league footballer who played in the 2000s and 2010s, as a  and .

Playing career
He was signed by Featherstone Rovers for the 2014 season as a replacement for Liam Finn.

References

External links
 (archived by web.archive.org) Batley Bulldogs profile
 (archived by web.archive.org) Bulldogs Tame Wildcats In Mount Thriller
 Moore Checks Back In
 A Word With Rhino

1989 births
Living people
Batley Bulldogs players
Dewsbury Rams players
English rugby league players
Featherstone Rovers players
Halifax R.L.F.C. players
Leeds Rhinos players
Rugby league five-eighths
Rugby league halfbacks
Rugby league players from Yorkshire
Scotland national rugby league team players
Wakefield Trinity players
York City Knights players